Panayot is a name derived from the Greek Panagiotis. The Romanian equivalent is Panait.

Panayot may refer to:

People
Panayot Butchvarov (born 1933), American philosopher
Panayot Cherna (1881–1913), Romanian writer and academic
Panayot Hitov (1830–1918), Bulgarian revolutionary
Panayot Panayotov (footballer) (born 1930), Bulgarian football forward
Panayot Pipkov, (1871–1942) Bulgarian composer
Panayot Volov, pseudonym of Petar Vankov, Bulgarian revolutionary
Panajot Pano, (born Panagiotis Panou, 1939–2010), Albanian football player

Places
Panayot Volovo, Shumen Municipality, Bulgaria
Panayot Hitovo, Omurtag Municipality, Bulgaria

See also
Panayot Volov Stadium, multi-use stadium in Shumen, Bulgaria
PFC Panayot Volov, a Bulgarian football club, playing in the city of Shumen

Bulgarian masculine given names
Given names of Greek language origin